Anant Balwant Dhumal (29 March 1914 – 13 February 1987), popularly known as Dhumal, was an actor in Bollywood films known for playing character roles. He acted in many movies and was active from the mid 1940s till the late 1980s. He started his acting career from Marathi theatre, which paved way for Marathi cinema and later he moved to Hindi cinema, where he mostly played comedy roles and later in his career, character roles. He worked in notable films such as Howrah Bridge (1958), Bombai Ka Babu (1960), Kashmir Ki Kali (1964), Gumnaam (1965), Do Badan (1966), Love in Tokyo (1966) and Benaam (1974).

Career
His career in acting began when he joined a drama company, where he served drinks and washed utensils. There would be occasions when artistes playing minor roles failed to turn up; this would give the spot boys an opportunity to fill in for them. This was how Dhumal landed up with bit roles in plays.

During this period, he met P. K. Atre and Nanasaheb Phatak, both big names in the drama world.  Soon, he started getting recognised and bigger roles came his way. Although he eventually became famous as a comedian in films, he was more well known as a villain. He played major roles in famous plays such as Lagna Chi Bedi and Ghara Baher.

From the stage, he shifted his focus to the silver screen. He worked in big movies such as Woh Kaun Thi, Ankhen, Gumnaam, Arzoo and Sasural. His first movie was a Marathi film called Pedgaonche Shahane (1952) in which he played the role of a South Indian.

He paired with fellow comedians Mehmood and Shobha Khote in numerous Hindi films, such as Sasural (1961).

Selected filmography

Death
Dhumal died on 13 February 1987 due to a massive heart attack.

References

External links

 
 

1914 births
1987 deaths
Male actors in Hindi cinema
20th-century Indian male actors
Male actors in Marathi theatre
Male actors in Marathi cinema
Indian male comedians
20th-century comedians